Edgardo "Egay" Gomez (August 14, 1942 – October 31, 2015) was a Filipino basketball player and coach.

Playing career
He played as forward-center. He is best remembered as “Go-Go-Gomez”, named by broadcaster Willie Hernandez in the 1960s. Before that, Egay had played in the NCAA. He started as a Light Bomber for Jose Rizal College from 1960 to 1962. After two years in the junior ranks, he spent three seasons with the Heavy Bombers. Egay teamed up with Rene Canent and his school was the NCAA champion in 1963 and 1964.

From 1966 to 1975, Egay played for the YCO Painters. At the start of the Philippine Basketball Association (PBA), he played for two years with the U-Tex Wranglers and spent his last season playing for San Miguel (then known as Royal Tru-Orange) in 1977.

Coaching career
Egay coached teams that included the Trinity Stallions and Jose Rizal College in the NCAA. When the YCO ballclub decided to return to basketball in the Philippine Amateur Basketball League in 1986, Egay became the coach of his former team. He coached the Shine Masters to two PABL titles and later on became assistant coach to Ely Capacio for Tanduay in the PBA during the final conference of the Elizalde ballclub.

References

External links
'Egay' Gomez passes on, 71

1942 births
2015 deaths
Filipino men's basketball players
Filipino men's basketball coaches
JRU Heavy Bombers basketball players
U/Tex Wranglers players
San Miguel Beermen players
Forwards (basketball)
Centers (basketball)
JRU Heavy Bombers basketball coaches
Tanduay Rhum Masters coaches